International Blind Golf Association (IBGA) (in Japanese) was established in 1998 as a disabled sports entity to organize, acknowledge and support international blind golf (visually impaired and blind golf) tournaments.  As of 2014, it has around 500 registered golfers.

History
In 1996, Haruhisa Handa who was the founder of Japanese Blind Golf Association appealed to blind golf associations around the world to set up a governing organization.  In 1997, the World Blind Golfers Conference was held in Perth, Australia, where representatives from six countries participated to propose the articles of association and handicap system.  In 1998, the proposal was resolved at a meeting held during the 5th Blind Golf World Championship in Florida, US, so that a global governing organization could be established.  Handa was elected as the first president, and David Blyth from Australia became the first chairman (responsible in administration).

There were eight organizations that took part in the World Blind Golfers’ Conference held in 1997 from 6 countries; Japan, United States, Canada, Australia, Ireland, England, Scotland and Northern Ireland.

As of 2014, International Blind Golf Association has 18 member organizations from 16 countries including 4 associate organizations from 4 countries.

Tour

Members
 Japanese Blind Golf Association (JBGA)
 United States Blind Golf Association (USBGA)
 Northern Ireland Blind Golf
 Scottish Blind Golf Society
 English Blind Golf Association
 Germany Blind Golf Association
 Ireland Blind Golf
 Republic of South Africa Blind Golf Association
 Australian Blind Golf Association
 Canadian Blind Golf Association
 Hong Kong Blind Golf Association
 South Korea Blind Golf Association 
 Italian Blind Golf Association
 Austrian Blind Golf Association

Associate members
 France
 Israel
 Malaysia
 Netherlands

References
Notes

External links
 International Blind Golf Association

International Sports Promotion Society
Parasports organizations
Blindness organizations
Golf associations
Blind sports